Events from the year 1852 in China.

Incumbents 
 Xianfeng Emperor (2nd year)

Viceroys
 Viceroy of Zhili — Nergingge
 Viceroy of Min-Zhe 
 Yutai
 Ji Zhichang
 Viceroy of Huguang 
 Yutai
 Viceroy of Shaan-Gan 
 Qishan 
 Saying'a (acting) 
 Yutai
 Šuhingga (acting, then de jure)
 Viceroy of Liangguang — Xu Guangjin
 Viceroy of Yun-Gui 
 Cheng Yucai
 Wu Wenrong
 Viceroy of Sichuan — Xu Zechun

Events 

 Second Opium War
 Taiping Rebellion
 December — Zeng Guofan appointed commissioner of militia organization for Central China

References